Fábio Miguel Valadares Cecílio  (born 6 April 1993) is a Portuguese futsal player who plays as a defender for Braga/AAUM and the Portugal national team.

Honours
Benfica
Campeonato Nacional: 2018–19
Taça da Liga: 2017–18, 2018–19, 2019–20
Supertaça de Portugal: 2015, 2016
International
UEFA Futsal Championship: 2018, 2022
FIFA Futsal World Cup: 2021
 Futsal Finalissima: 2022

Orders
  Commander of the Order of Prince Henry
  Commander of the Order of Merit

References

External links

1993 births
Living people
Sportspeople from Matosinhos
Futsal defenders
Portuguese men's futsal players
S.L. Benfica futsal players